Mark Harrington (Born in , in San Francisco) is an HIV/AIDS researcher, a staunch activist for HIV/AIDS and tuberculosis awareness, and the co-founder and policy director of the Treatment Action Group (TAG). After graduating from Harvard University in 1983, Harrington spent time exploring and did not commit to one specific career. When the AIDS epidemic became personal for Harrington, and close friends were being infected with HIV (he himself was diagnosed in 1990), he decided to take action and joined the group, AIDS Coalition to Unleash Power or ACT UP. As part of the Treatment and Data Committee of ACT UP, Harrington fostered relationships with government officials associated with AIDS research. Eventually differences in opinions on how to best advocate for HIV/AIDS research led to Harrington and other members of ACT UP leaving to start their own group, TAG. With TAG, Harrington was able to create influential and meaningful policy regarding HIV/AIDS research and he worked closely with the NIH, WHO, and other government organizations. Over the years Harrington has distinguished himself as an adept scientist and reputable researcher in his own right. Currently he is published in multiple scientific journals and continues to be an advocate for those with HIV and TB around the world.

Personal life 
Harrington grew up in the suburbs of San Francisco where he lived with his liberal-minded and well-educated family. He is the eldest of four children. His father Richard was a lawyer and his mother Judith is a painter. His father was a local celebrity for his work defending conscientious objectors during the Vietnam War, including a role as lead attorney in the Supreme Court case: Negre V. Larsen.

Harrington began his college career at Harvard after graduating from Lowell High School in 1977, expecting to follow in his father's footsteps and study law or public policy. It was in his first year at Harvard that Harrington discovered he was gay. At the time Harvard was not a welcoming environment towards the LGBTQ+ community. Being openly gay and also succeeding in the professional world was not something that Harrington felt he could do given the times and his situation. In 1979 Harrington took some time off from Harvard to realign himself, which entailed taking a half-year trip to Europe, before returning in 1981. He finally graduated in 1983 as a visual and environmental studies major.

After Harvard, Harrington spent three years working at The Coffee Connection in Cambridge, Massachusetts. Over the next few years he dabbled in many artistic endeavors and was involved in three relationships. In 1985 he met New York native, Jay Funk and this led to his translocation to New York in 1986 even though the relationship did not last much longer after the move.

Harrington found out that he was living with HIV in 1990.

AIDS Activism

Early Activism and ACT UP 
Harrington first became involved in HIV/AIDS activism after a close friend was diagnosed with HIV in 1988. His interests in social change and power dynamics, which he explored during his time at Harvard, led to him joining the AIDS activism group ACT UP. As a member of ACT UP Harrington worked on the Treatment and Data Committee with Iris Long, Jim Eigo, and others. The Committee was successful in expediting the process of accessing certain experimental AIDS drugs and others still in the process of being approved by the FDA. Much of Harrington's own work and ideas also centered around better communication with AIDS research groups. Harrington's efforts proved fruitful as he and others on his committee would dine with the director of the NIAID, Anthony Fauci, to work together to discuss future plans for research. Harrington and his counterparts who worked directly with scientists and researchers were well versed in academia and science so as to keep up with these professionals they dealt with on a daily basis. In the late eighties, Fauci even proposed hiring Harrington, as he was "dazzled by his brilliance". As the relationships between certain members of ACT UP and officials within the government grew, there began to be infighting with other members of ACT UP.

In Let The Record Show: A Political History of ACT UP New York, 1987-1993, Sarah Schulman writes, "Scanning the interviews I conducted with a wide range and demographic of ACT UPers, the two names that emerge most often in reference to internal leadership are clearly Maxine Wolfe and Mark Harrington...these two were repeatedly named as profound influences." Schulman also writes, "These are the two people most often blamed with ACT UP's downfall and self-defeat, and the two most frequently named at the center of ACT UP's victories and strengths."

Founding TAG 
Issues within ACT UP such as a divided organization, a lack of funding, and tension on how to best allocate time and resources ultimately led to a split in the organization. In response, Harrington along with 20 other members of ACT UP left the organization in 1992 to form their own group known as the Treatment Action Group, or TAG. To Harrington, the split did not represent a failure on ACT UP's part. Instead, it was a necessary and foreseeable event as the organization was not destined to last.

Work with Treatment Action Group (TAG) 
The foundational principles of TAG were to foster the relationships between activists and researchers (both public and private), serve as a watchdog for ethical practices, and support research that led to the best possible treatments. Harrington and his fellow founding members of TAG hoped for a new era to HIV/AIDS activism, and activism in general: one in which the government was not an enemy, but a partner. Harrington points out that the most important part to the work of TAG was to make researchers more aware of the needs of the people whom their research impacts, in this case people with HIV/AIDS, and also for people in general to be more educated on the work of researchers. TAG was the middle man between the two.

The first major policy victory for Harrington and TAG, was the report: AIDS Research at the NIH: A Critical Review. Drafted in 1992 by Harrington and another TAG member, Gregg Gonsalves, the report outlined certain suggestions the NIH should take to better allocate resources towards and handle HIV/AIDS research. The NIH listened to these suggestions and incorporated them into the NIH Revitalization ACT of 1993, signed into effect by President Bill Clinton. The act restructured and strengthened the NIH AIDS research program and created the Office of AIDS Research to oversee all forms of HIV/AIDS research in the United States.

Another important moment for Harrington was his 1992 "Pathogensis and Activism" speech given at the Eighth International AIDS Conference in Amsterdam. Here Harrington explained to the world TAG's platform of cooperation instead of continuing trends of antagonism. Along with this, he used his own HIV infected lymph nodes to explain some of the mechanisms behind HIV and urge other people with AIDS to take part in research trials. His speech also doubled as a public "coming out" with his status as HIV-positive, one which many were not aware of.

Other notable accomplishments for Harrington and TAG were the papers: The Crisis in Clinical AIDS Research(1993), Rescuing Accelerated Approval: Moving Beyond the Status Quo(1994), and Problems with Protease Inhibitor Development Plans(1995). The first was his own paper which highlighted poor standards in clinical trials conducted by the US Department of Defense, ACTG, and other organizations. The other two papers were significant during the development of protease inhibitors.

Current Work 
Harrington has been involved in numerous boards, councils, and committees for the NIH, FDA, and World Health Organization (WHO). Namely he was on the FDA Antiviral Drugs Advisory Committee and the NIH AIDS Research Program Evaluation Working Group. This group helped restructure the NIH yet again to better allocate resources for HIV/AIDS research.

Harrington has begun to focus his efforts on the global AIDS pandemic. After receiving the grant money from the MacArthur Foundation, Harrington felt that it would be best served to help combat HIV infections in countries that are largest and most devastatingly hit. Harrington and Gregg Gonsalves are the only two AIDS activists to ever receive a MacArthur Fellowship, commonly but unofficially known as the "Genius Grant". The two worked together and were members of ACT UP and TAG. 

In 2007 he received a $4.7 million grant from the Bill and Melinda Gates Foundation which he used for expanding initiatives to educate AIDS activists in Africa on the dangers and truths of TB, and increase government intervention. His work on tuberculosis began in 2002, and continues to present day. Harrington hopes to get more emphasis put on tuberculosis as it is characteristically a disease of the poor and marginalized so it has not gotten the same attention as the indiscriminate HIV virus did.

Most recently Harrington worked with New York State Ending the Epidemic Task Force whose goal was to end AIDS in New York by 2020.

He writes papers for journals such as Lancet, PLoS Magazine, and Science.

Awards
1997 MacArthur Fellows Program
2007 Bill and Melinda Gates Foundation Grant

Works

AIDS Research at the NIH: A Critical Review with Gregg Gonsalves (Presented at VIII International Conference on AIDS, Amsterdam, the Netherlands, July 20, 1992)
Pathogenesis and Activism (Presented at VIII International Conference on AIDS, Amsterdam, July 22, 1992)
The Crisis in Clinical AIDS Research (December 1993)
Rescuing Accelerated Approval: Moving Beyond the Status Quo with Spencer Cox, Dennis Davidson, Gregg Gonsalves, Carlton Hogan, and Rebecca Pringle Smith (A Report to the FDA Antiviral Drugs Advisory Committee in Silver Spring, Maryland on September 12–13, 1994)
Problems with Protease Inhibitor Development Plans with David Barr, Spencer Cox, Gregg Gonsalves, Derek Link, Michael Ravitch, and Theo Smart (For the National Task Force on AIDS Drug Development in Washington, D.C. on February 23, 1995)
AIDS Research Highlights from the 35th Interscience Conference on Antimicrobial Agents & Chemotherapy (ICAAC) with Michael Marco, Spencer Cox and Tim Horn (San Francisco, California on September 17–20, 1995)
Position Paper on Accelerated Approval for INVIRASE Brand Saquinavir (November 7, 1995)
Viral Load in Vancouver (A Report from the 11th International Conference on AIDS, Vancouver, British Columbia, on July 8–10, 1996)
Access Versus Answers (1996)
It's Time to Change the Standard of Care For People With AIDS (February 24, 1997)
Notes from the Gallo Lab Meeting (September 19, 1998)
 "Hit HIV-1 hard, but only when necessary", Mike Harrington, Charles C.J. Carpenter M.D., The Lancet (355, 17 June 2000)
 "World Health Organization HIV Treatment Guidelines Evolve", The Body Winter 2010

References

Further reading
 "Mark Harrington was wrong: ACT UP & TAG: A Brief History of AIDS Treatment ACTAGanism", LGNY, March 1996, Raan Medley.

American health activists
People from San Francisco
Living people
Harvard University alumni
MacArthur Fellows
HIV/AIDS activists
Activists from California
Year of birth missing (living people)
American LGBT rights activists